The Florida Museum of Photographic Arts (FMoPA) is a museum dedicated to exhibiting important photographic art as central to contemporary life and culture. FMoPA also enriches the community by operating outreach programs to educate children and adults. FMoPA is one of fewer than ten museums in the United States dedicated exclusively to photography and one of two such museums in Florida. In addition, the museum is home to high-impact community programs such as the Children's Literacy Through Photography program for at-risk children and adult photography classes, workshops, and children's summer camps.  FMOPA’s upcoming move to historic Ybor City gives the promise of growth and a new and dynamic environment to showcase its extensive collection and host exhibitions from acclaimed photographers.

Prior to being renamed the Florida Museum of Photographic Arts in the summer of 2006, FMoPA was named the Tampa Gallery of Photographic Arts.

Permanent collection
The photographic works in the growing permanent collection include an entire suite of Harold Edgerton's landmark works using his invention, the strobe light.  Also in the collection are Len Prince's celebrity portraits, a notable Dorothea Lange, a portrait of Ansel Adams by Judy Dater, scenes of Pittsburgh by Charles "Teenie" Harris and a body of work by Dianora Niccolini, a pioneer in the photographing of the male nude. The female nude is well represented in a work by Ruth Bernhard. Burk Uzzle's iconic Woodstock scenes as well as Bud Lee's unforgettable views of the 1960s and 1970s counterculture document important moments in American history.  More historical moments are found in an expanding collection of panoramic (or "Cirkut") photographs taken in the early 20th century, including views of the construction of the Panama Canal and of early Tampa history.

Partnerships 
The Florida Museum of Photographic art is currently partnered with Arts Council of Hillsborough County, the University of Tampa, and the Tampa Bay Times Forum. The Arts Council helps promote the museum and provides funds to support the museum and all its work. The University of Tampa works with the museum to support their Cultural Outreach Partners program. The program encourages students from the university to visit the museum and appreciate the art by providing free access to the art venues.

Accreditation 
The museum is accredited by the American Alliance of Museums.

Exhibitions 

 Masters of Black & White Exhibition, May 4 – July 1, 2001
 Faces and Places: One Man Show by Herb Snitzer, September 9 – October 28, 2001
 War and Peace: World War II, December 8, 2001 – January 27, 2002
 The Photography of Peter B. Kaplan, March 23 – June 2, 2002
 Post 9-11: Slices of Life from Countries Once Foreign, September 6 – October 27, 2002
 Clyde Butcher Retrospective, November 2, 2002 – January 5, 2003
 Berenice Abbott: American Photographer: A Fantastic Passion, February 1 – March 30, 2003
 Black Culture Viewed Through the Lens, May 2 – June 29, 2003
 Stopping Time: Photographs of Harold Edgerton, September 13 – October 26, 2003
 Hard Won Dreams: the American Southwest: Photographs of Bruce Dale, November 8, 2003 – January 11, 2004
 Abstractions and the Neo-Cubist Order: Photographs of Barbara Kasten, February 7 – April 18, 2004
 Cut, Edit and Embellish – A Life in Collage: an Exhibition of Photography by Hugh Shurley, October 16, 2004 – January 2, 2005
 Caterpillar’s Conundrum: The Photographic Investigations of Todd Watts, February. 18 – April 17, 2005
 In Sight: Images from Our Children’s Program, May 20 – July 9, 2005
 One Shot Harris: The Photographys of Charles "Teenie" Harris, September 24, 2005 – January 29, 2006
 No Man’s Land The Photography of Lynne Cohen, March 17 – May 21, 2006
 Eyes of A Child: Images from Our Children’s Literacy through Photography Program, June 9–23, 2006
 Aaron Siskind: A Harlem Document (1932–1940), September 15 – November 5, 2006
 Technology Into Art: The Photogravure from 1850 to Today, November 10, 2006 – January 28, 2007
 Tom Abercrombie: National Geographic Photographer, February 2 – April 15, 2007
 Face to Face: Judy Dater’s Portraits from Italy and California, April 20, 2007 – June 15, 2007
 Florida Showcase, August 10 – September 8, 2007
 Cuba: Selected Works of Clyde Butcher and Maria Martinez-Canas, September 18 – November 10, 2007
 Cuba Particular: (Private Cuba) The Photography of David Audet, September 18 – November 10, 2007
 Life in Cuba: Photographs from the personal collections of area families, September 18 – November 10, 2007
 Eye in the Sky: The Works of Robert Hartman, November 16, 2007 – January 9, 2008
 The Magic Box of Abelardo Morell and Panoramic Views of the Past: Cirkut Photographs by the Burgert Brothers, January 2008
 Masters of Black and White: Including selections from the Drapkin Collection, April 2008
 Masks & Identity: Len Prince in the Collection of William K. Zewadski, June 2008
 Eyes of A Child: Summer Showcase, June 12 – 28, 2008
 Graciela Iturbide: The Spirits of the Earth, September 18 – November 8, 2008.
 Twice Exposed: Photographic & Print works from the Permanent Collection of the USF Contemporary Art Museum, November 20, 2008
 NFL History from Getty Images, January 22 – February 26, 2009
 My Neighborhood, February 3 – 14, 2009
 Contemporary Chinese Photography, March 12 – May, 2009
 The Disappeared: Native American Images from the Drapkin Collection, May 21, 2009
 Eyes of A Child: Summer Showcase, July 11–25, 2009
 Burk Uzzle’s Woodstock and Other Americana, September 17, 2009
 Flashback: Photos from the Tampa Bay Community, September 17, 2009
 Andrea Modica: Flights of the Soul, November 2009
 August Sander, the Twentieth Century Man / Jules Aarons, Views from the Street, January 2010
 Portraits of the Artists and Other Selections from the Collection of Robert and Elizabeth Sanchez, March 2010
 Infected Landscape: Works by Shai Kremer, May 27 – July 17, 2010
 R. Daniel Harnly Memorial Juried Student Showcase, May 27 – June 26, 2010
 Naked City: Photography from Vassar College’s Frances Lehman Loeb Art Center, January 2011
 Natural Fashion: Art and the Body, Photographs by Hans Silvester, February 10 – April 10, 2011
 Classic Images: Photography by Ansel Adams, April 28 – July 6, 2011
 Life and Death by Duane Michals, September 8 – November 6, 2011.
 Bud Lee's America & Celebration of the Body: The Works of Dianora Niccolini, November 17, 2011 – January 8, 2012
 Andy Warhol & Friends, March 10 – May 27, 2012
 The Secret Paris of the 1930s: Vintage Photographs by Brassaï, May 31 – August 19, 2012
 Portraits of Power: Photographs by Platon, August 23 – November 11, 2012
 Mario Algaze: Cuba 1999–2000, October 18 – January 27, 2013
 Dorothea Lange’s America, November 15 – January 27, 2013
 Chuck Close: A Couple Ways of Doing Something, January 31 – March 31, 2013
 Vivian Maier: Out of the Shadows, April 4 – June 16, 2013
 Edward S. Curtis Photogravures from the Collection of Deli Sacilotto, June 20 – September 8, 2013
 New Visions: Contemporary Artist Series, Featuring Edmund Fountain, Sissi Farassat, and Jim Reynolds, June 20 – September 8, 2013
 Frida & Friends: The Life and Times of Frida Kahlo, September 12 – November 10, 2013
 Exposing the Self: Photography and Surrealism, September 12 – November 10, 2013
 Gangsters, Pirates, & Cigars: A Photographic History of Tampa 1879–1955, November 15 – February 23, 2014
 David Hilliard: Intimacies, March 7 – May 18, 2014
 New Visions: Polly Gaillard and Allison Hunter, May 23 – August 31, 2014
 Ruth Bernhard: Body and Form, September 5 – December 28, 2014
 Elger Esser: Combray, October 6, 2014 – March 29, 2015
 Jim Reynolds: Cityscapes, April 1, 2015 – June 30, 2015
 Vaiven: Six Visual Journeys between Spain and the US, October 2, 2015 – November 30, 2015
 Faces of Alzheimer's, January 2, 2016 – March 1, 2016
 Sandra Gottlieb: Earth and Water, January 2, 2016 – March 25, 2016
 Gohar Dashti: Iran Untitled and Stateless, January 2, 2016 – June 1, 2016
 Danny Lyon: People, April 1, 2016 – June 30, 2016
 Shai Kremer: Concrete Abstract, June 3, 2016 – September 25, 2016
 Jerry Uelsmann: Undiscovered Self, July 2016 – December 2016
 There is a Light that Never Goes Out: Wendy Babcox, Jason Lazarus, Noelle Mason, September 2016 – December 2016
 Lynn Saville: Dark City, October 21, 2016 – November 20, 2016
 By the Yard: Cirkut Camera Photography, January – December 2017
 Linda Connor: Gravity, January 16, 2017 – March 31, 2017
 The Boomer List: Photographs by Timothy Greenfield-Sanders, April 28, 2017 – June 8, 2017
 She Loves Me, She Loves Me Not, June 10, 2017 – September 10, 2017
 Under the Cuban Sun, September 22, 2017 – December 31, 2017
 Chris Buck: Magnificent Hurt, January 26, 2018 – March 16, 2018
 Roger Steffens: The Family Acid, January 26, 2018 – March 16, 2018
 Jean Pagliuso: Poultry, Raptors, Places of Ritual, January 26, 2018 – March 16, 2018
 Andrea Modica: Minor League and Best Friends, April 1, 2018 – June 30, 2018
 Patty Carroll: Anonymous Women: Camouflage and Calamity, April 1, 2018 – June 30, 2018
 Cathy Dutertre: Quest, May 1 – 31, 2018
 Bruce Dale: Beyond the Lens, July 1 – September 30, 2018
 City of Tampa Photographer Laureates 2003–2013, July 1 – September 30, 2018
 Day by Day: 1968, October 1 – December 30, 2018
 North and South: Berenice Abbott’s U.S. Route 1. October 8, 2018 – January 11, 2019
 Modus Operandi: Contemporary Photography from the collection of BNY Mellon, January 15 – April 15, 2019
 Lost and Found in America, January 21 – April 22, 2019
 Olivia Parker: Vanishing in Plain Sight, April 21 – August 31, 2019
 Viktor Fresno: Mirroring Me, May 10 – June 15, 2019
 United Photographic Artists Gallery, August 1 – September 7, 2019
 2019 Members Show, September – October 2019
 Reframed, September – December 2020
 Bruce Davidson: New York, September – December 2020
 Garry Winogrand: Women are Beautiful, September 8, 2019 – January 5, 2020
 Stephen Wilkes: Day to Night, September 1, 2019 – January 12, 2020
 Roger Ballen: In Retrospect, January 10 – April 26, 2020
 Griff Davis and Langston Hughs, Letters and Photographs 1947-1967: A Global Friendship, January 17 - April 19, 2020
 Portals of Intent - FROM EARTH, March 2 - May 3, 2020
 The Eye of the Storm (relating to police brutality, institutionalized racism, and the 2020 Black Lives Matter movement), August 2020
 2020 Members Show, September - October, 2020
 8th Annual United Photographic Artists Gallery, November 2020
 Jeff Whetstone: Batture Ritual, January - September 2021
 Bremner Benedict – Hidden Waters / Desert Springs / Uncertain Future, January - September 2021
 Noelle Mason: X-Ray Vision vs Invisibility, February - 
 Picture (im)Perfect, April 16 - May 31, 2021.

Blog 
The Florida Museum of Photographic Arts has a blog on their official website with articles about museum exhibitions, upcoming events, artists, and the importance of photography.

Outreach 
The museum has many outreach programs such as a collaboration with the Girl Scouts, working with the Little Kids, Big Minds children's program, and a photography benefit sale. They have many collaborations with organizations such as the Tampa Bay Businesses for Culture and the Arts, Hillsborough County Public Library, the Smithsonian, Wellness and Community, and the Tampa International Gay and Lesbian Film Festival. The museum offers a multitude of classes on different types of photography such as, analog photography, basic photography, creative photography, photographs of people and places, product photography, and smartphone and social media.

Online Exhibitions 
The museum offers two online exhibitions, the Veterans Exhibition and the 10th Annual International Photography Competition. For the Veterans Exhibition the museum worked with Hillsborough County Public Library to show photographs showing the experience of veterans who have returned to civilian life. The exhibition is to help with the healing process of the veterans. The second exhibition, the 10th Annual International Photography Competition, showcases. Many different types of art and a competition was conducted to name the winner in each category. Some of the categories included were still life, people/portraits, places/landscapes/drones, and abstract photography.

References

External links
 Florida Museum of Photographic Arts website

Museums in Tampa, Florida
Art museums and galleries in Florida
Photography museums and galleries in the United States
Institutions accredited by the American Alliance of Museums
Museums established in 2001
Tourist attractions in Tampa, Florida
Landmarks in Tampa, Florida
2001 establishments in Florida